This is a list of members of the South Australian House of Assembly from 1902 to 1905, as elected at the 1902 state election:

 Victoria and Albert MHA Andrew Dods Handyside died on 23 May 1904. William Senior won the resulting by-election on 25 June.

References

External links
History of South Australian elections 1857–2006, volume 1: ECSA

Members of South Australian parliaments by term
20th-century Australian politicians